Wilheim Schulte (January 28, 1920 – November 19, 2005), also known professionally as Willy Schulte and Willi Schulte, was a German actor and writer. He has 151 film credits to his name,  including Königlich Bayerisches Amtsgericht (1969), Tatort (1970) and Lindenstraße (1985).

References

21st-century German male actors
1920 births
2005 deaths
German male film actors
People from Munich